The Zaamurets was an armoured train, originally built by the Russian Empire in 1916, that saw service during the First World War, Russian Civil War, and during the Chinese Warlord era. It frequently changed owners and names.

History

Zaamurets was built in Odessa in 1916. It entered service with the Russian Imperial Army in October of that year. It saw service in the First World War in Galicia.

The train was captured by the Red Guards in January 1918, and renamed Lenin, after which it was employed during the Russian Civil War. It was then combined with another train, the Khunkhuz-type BP No.3, and renamed BP No.4. It was deployed to the Trans-Siberian Railway to help counter the Czechoslovak Legion's use of armoured trains. In July 1918, soon after its arrival in the area, it was captured by the Legion and renamed Orlik. As the Legion retreated to Vladivostok along the Chinese Eastern Railway in April 1920, the train was captured by the Japanese Imperial Army at Hailar, Inner Mongolia, following a skirmish known as the "Hailar incident" in which over 20 Japanese soldiers died. The commander of the Siberian Expeditionary Army Ōi Shigemoto later gave it back to the Legion in Harbin, after which it was given to White Russian forces in September 1920 upon the Legion's return to Czechoslovakia. The White Russians, allied with the Manchuria-based Fengtian clique, then utilised the train in battles in China during the Warlord era.

It was finally captured by the Japanese Kwantung Army in 1931 and renamed Train No. 105, after which its history is unknown.

References

Armoured trains
Czechoslovak Legion